Leonard "Len" Aston (14 June 1920 – 19 November 1987)  was an English professional rugby league footballer who played in the 1930s, 1940s and 1950s.

Background
Aston was born in Prescot, Lancashire, England.

Playing career

International honours
Len Aston won caps for England while at St. Helens in 1947 against Wales, and France, in 1948 against France, and won caps for Great Britain while at St. Helens in 1947 against New Zealand (3 matches).

Testimonial match
Len Aston's testimonial match at St. Helens took place against Hull F.C. at Knowsley Road, St. Helens on Saturday 3 March 1951.

References

External links
Profile at saints.org.uk

1920 births
1987 deaths
England national rugby league team players
English rugby league players
Great Britain national rugby league team players
Place of death missing
Rugby league centres
Rugby league locks
Rugby league props
Rugby league second-rows
Rugby league utility players
Rugby league players from St Helens, Merseyside
St Helens R.F.C. players